Threnosia heminephes, the halved footman, is a moth of the subfamily Arctiinae first described by Edward Meyrick in 1886. It is found in Australia, where it has been recorded from the Australian Capital Territory, New South Wales and Victoria.

References

Lithosiini